Ken Bone (born 1958) is an American basketball coach. 

Ken Bone or Ken Bones may also refer to:
Ken Bone (political activist), (born 1982), a questioner at the second United States presidential debate, 2016
Ken Bones, English actor